Alicja Józefa Kornasiewicz (born March 19, 1951 in Kańczuga) is a Polish economist, manager and politician. She was a member of Polish parliament and served as Secretary of State and Vice Minister at the Ministry of State Treasury in Poland. She is a managing director of the Warsaw office of Morgan Stanley and chair of Cineworld.

Education
Kornasiewicz studied at Szkoła Główna Planowania i Statystyki. She received a PhD degree from Poznań University of Economics. 

In 1978, she passed exams as Statutory auditor; she is a member of the National Chamber of Statutory Auditors in Poland. She attended the six-week Advanced Management Programme at Harvard Business School and the Executive and Advanced Management Programme at INSEAD.

Career 
At the first free elections after the democratic transition in Poland, Kornasiewicz became a member of parliament from 1989 to 1991, representing the Polish People's Party (election district of Płock). In the government of Jerzy Buzek, she served as Secretary of State in the Polish Ministry of the Treasury from 1997 to 2000.

Prior to that she worked for the European Bank for Reconstruction and Development (EBRD) as a senior banker in London. Kornasiewicz was head of emerging European countries investment banking at Unicredit Group and a member of the Executive Committee at the bank's Markets & Investment Banking Division. From 2010, she was CEO of Polish Bank Pekao SA.

In January 2012, Kornasiewicz joined Morgan Stanley as a senior adviser in investment banking covering Poland and Central and Eastern Europe (CEE). She is a managing director of the Warsaw office of the firm. Kornasiewicz is a jury member at Galeria Chwały Polskiej Ekonomii.

In May 2020, Kornasiewicz became chair of Cineworld, having been a non-executive director since May 2015.

References

External links
 Alicja Kornasiewicz joins Morgan Stanley as a Senior Adviser in Poland and CEE, press release, Morgan Stanley, January 26, 2012

21st-century Polish businesspeople
SGH Warsaw School of Economics alumni
Living people
Women members of the Sejm of the Republic of Poland
Members of the Contract Sejm
1951 births
Polish women in business
20th-century Polish women politicians
21st-century businesswomen